A list of films produced in Cambodia in 1973. From the 38 films listed, 2 films exist today, 5 have been remade, and 31 have not yet been remade.

1973

See also 
1973 in Cambodia

References 
 

1973
Films
Cambodian